Zoar may refer to:

 Zoara, a city mentioned in Genesis as part of the Biblical Pentapolis

Places
Canada
 Zoar, Newfoundland and Labrador
England
 Zoar, Cornwall
South Africa
 Zoar, Western Cape
United States
 Zoar, Delaware
 Zoar, Indiana
 Zoar, Massachusetts
 Zoar, New York
 Zoar, Ohio, a village in Tuscarawas County, Ohio
 Zoar, Warren County, Ohio
 Zoar, Wisconsin

Other
 Zoar (band), an experimental, gothic, ambient and classical group
 Zoar (Aylett, Virginia), a farmstead listed on the National Register of Historic Places in King William County, Virginia
 Zoar (Masters of the Universe), a fictional character in the Masters of the Universe franchise

See also
 Zoar Bible Christian Church in the Penfield, South Australia
 Zoar Chapel in Canterbury, England
 Zoar State Forest in Virginia
 Zoar Valley in New York
 , Soar being the Welsh spelling of Zoar